Fromia milleporella, common name red starfish or black spotted starfish, is a species of starfish belonging to the family Goniasteridae.

Description
Red seastars may have various shades of red.

Distribution
This species can be found in the Indo-West Pacific starting as far south as Madagascar and to as far north as the Red Sea, as well as the Maldives area, Sri Lanka, Bay of Bengal, East Indies, north Australia, Philippines, China, south Japan and the South Pacific.

Habitat
It lives at depths of  0 – 73 m.

Nutrition and management of the aquarium
The species is also considered in reef aquariums. It feeds on a thin layers of algae, and so it can live only in an old well-established aquarium. Little can be done to supplement its diet. The red seastar is known to be very intolerant of sudden changes in water chemistry.

References

External links
 

milleporella
Animals described in 1816